Rafael Lara Grajales (municipality) is a town and municipality in Puebla in south-eastern Mexico. The municipality is named after the revolutionary general Rafael Lara Grajales.

The town has a sister city in North Korea: Sariwon.

References

Municipalities of Puebla